Biometal or biometals may refer to:

Biometal (biology), metal ions important in biology, biochemistry, and medicine
BioMetals (journal)

Video games 
BioMetal (video game), a 1993 video game
A technological device used in the Mega Man ZX series of video games
Battlezone (1998 video game), a video game where Biometal is the resource
Battlezone II: Combat Commander, a 1999 video game where Biometal is the resource